Suzanne Verhoeven (born 8 May 1996) is a Belgian professional racing cyclist. She signed to ride for the UCI Women's Team  for the 2019 women's road cycling season. She is the daughter of dutch former cyclist Nico Verhoeven.

Major results

Cyclo-cross

2015–2016
 3rd Marle
2017–2018
 2nd Les Franqueses del Valles
 2nd Sion
 3rd Contern
2019–2020
 Stockholm Weekend
1st Stockholm
1st Täby Park
 National Trophy Series
3rd Crawley
2020–2021
 Stockholm Weekend
1st Stockholm
1st Täby Park
 Toi Toi Cup
2nd Rýmařov
 2nd Gościęcin
2021–2022
 1st Asker Day 1
 2nd Ardooie
 2nd Asker Day 2
 Stockholm Weekend
2nd Täby Park
3rd Stockholm
 Toi Toi Cup
3rd Mlada Boleslav
 3rd Contern
 3rd Illnau
 3rd Oisterwijk
2022–2023
 Stockholm Weekend
1st Täby Park
2nd Stockholm
 1st Keila

Road

2018
 4th Time trial, National Under-23 Championships

References

External links
 

1996 births
Living people
Belgian female cyclists
Place of birth missing (living people)
Cyclo-cross cyclists